Thisaravi is a 2000 Sri Lankan Sinhala adult romantic film directed by Dharmashri Wickramasinghe and co-produced by director himself with Chandra Wickramasinghe. It stars Roger Seneviratne and Shehara Jayaweera in lead roles along with Arjuna Kamalanath and Senaka Wijesinghe. Music composed by Priyanath Ratnayake. It is the 937th Sri Lankan film in the Sinhala cinema.

Plot

Cast
 Roger Seneviratne
 Shehara Jayaweera as Mekhala
 Arjuna Kamalanath
 Igneshes Gunarathna
 Deepani Silva
 Jayantha Ranawaka
 Senaka Wijesinghe
 Sandeepa Sewmini
 Saman Hemarathna
 Susila Kuragama
 Anne Kumari
 Wimal Wicramaarachchi
 Rathna Lanka Abeywickrama
 Deepani Madushika
 Vindya Madushani
 Eddy Amarasinghe

References

External links
 සිංහල සිනමාවේ සත්තු

2000 films
2000s Sinhala-language films